Anthony Giacobazzi is a French rugby union player, born 15 June 1988 in Toulon (Var), who plays as scrum half for RC Toulonnais.

He was at the pôle espoir à Marcoussis for the 2006-2007 season.

Career 
 Since 2007 : RC Toulon

Honours 
 France – U18 and U19

External links 
  Player profile at lequipe.fr
  Statistics at itsrugby.fr
 
  "Et soudain Giacobazzi devint rouge et noir", interview with La Marseillaise

French rugby union players
Rugby union scrum-halves
Sportspeople from Toulon
RC Toulonnais players
Living people
Year of birth missing (living people)